Bicker (also: Bicker van Swieten and Bicker Caarten) is a very old Dutch patrician family (since 1390). The family has played an important role during the Dutch Golden Age. They were at the centre of Amsterdam oligarchy from the beginning of the 17th century until the early 1650s. They led the Dutch States Party and were in opposition to the House of Orange. Since 1815 the family belongs to the new Dutch nobility with the honorific of jonkheer or jonkvrouw.

History

Early times 
The Bicker family is the oldest Amsterdam patrician family still in existence today. Their lineage begins with Dirck Helmer, who was recorded in Amsterdam in 1383 and 1390. His son Jan Helmer was mayor and alderman (Dutch: Schepen) of the city and was married to a woman from the Van den Anxter family. Their son Dirck Jansz van den Anxter († 1468), priest and milliner, took his maternal name and was married to a woman from the Bicker family. Their son Mr. Pieter Meeuws Soossensz Bicker (1430-1476), Schepen van Amsterdam in 1473, took the maternal family name Bicker and thus acted as the male progenitor of the upfollowing Bicker family. He was married to Aeltgen Eggert († after 1455) from the family of Willem Eggert. Both the Helmer-Bicker and Bicker families belonged to the urban elite as early as the 15th century. Jan Dircksz Helmer was mentioned as mayor of Amsterdam in 1433 and Boel Jacobszn Bicker (?–1505) in 1495 and 1497 respectively.

Genealogical and political Legacy
 

Andries and Cornelis Bicker, together with their cousins Cornelis and Andries de Graeff, saw themselves as the political heirs of the old regent family Boelens, whose main lineage, which had remained catholic, had died out in the male line in 1647. They had received the very significant first names Andries and Cornelis from their Boelens ancestors. As in a real dynasty, members of the two families frequently intermarried in the 17th century in order to keep their political and commercial capital together. Its great historical ancestor was Andries Boelens (1455-1519), the city's most influential medieval mayor. Both families, Bicker and De Graeff, descend in the female line from Boelens, He was allowed to hold the highest office in Amsterdam fifteen times.

Dutch Golden Age 

During the Dutch Golden Age, the Bicker family was very critical against the influence of the House of Orange. They belonged to the republican political movement of the Regenten, also referred to as the ‘state oriented’, as opposed to the Royalists. Together with the Republican political leader Johan de Witt and the republican-minded Cornelis and Andries de Graeff, the Bickers strived for the abolition of stadtholdership. They desired the full sovereignty of the individual regions in a form in which the Republic of the United Seven Netherlands was not ruled by a single person. Instead of a sovereign (or stadtholder) the political and military power was lodged with the States General and with the regents of the cities in Holland. During the two decades from the 1630 to the 1650s the Bicker family had a leading role in the Amsterdam administration, the city was at the peak of its political power.

In 1646, seven members of the Bicker family, called the Bicker's league, simultaneously held some political position or other. Members of that league where the brothers Andries, Jacob, Jan, Cornelis, Andries' son Gerard Bicker, and their distant cousins, the brothers Jacob Jacobsz Bicker (1612-1676; he was also the husband of Andries' daughter Alida Bicker) and Hendrick Jacobsz Bicker (1615-1651). The Bickers provided silver and ships to Spain, and were very much interested in ending the Eighty Years War. This brought them in conflict with the stadtholder, some provinces, like Zeeland and Utrecht, and the Reformed preachers. After the Peace of Münster (1648) was signed, the Bickers were of the opinion that it was no longer necessary to maintain a standing army, bringing them into vehement conflict with prince Willem II. To regain power William went on the march towards Dordrecht and Amsterdam with an army. His troops got lost in a dense fog and were discovered by the postal courier on Hamburg. The mayors of Amsterdam had the civic guard called out, the bridges raised, the gates closed and the artillery dragged into position.

After that the leader of the family and the Bickerse league, Andries Bicker, was purged from the vroedschap, as was his brother Cornelis Bicker, as one of the conditions of the treaty that followed, led by Cornelis de Graeff and Joan Huydecoper van Maarsseveen. Henceforth, it was the equally republican-minded brothers Cornelis and Andries de Graeff and their following who dominated Amsterdam. His niece Wendela Bicker married the Grand Pensionary Johan de Witt.

The Dutch historian and archivist Bas Dudok van Heel about the inppact of the Bicker and the linked De Graeff family and their missed (high) noble rank: In Florence families like Bicker and De Graeff would have been uncrowned princes. Here, in 1815, they should at least have been raised to the rank of count, but the southern Dutch nobility would not have put up with that. What you got here remained nothing half and nothing whole.

Family members (selection) 
 Dirck Jansz (Helmer) van den Anxter († 1468), married with a Bicker
 Pieter Meeuws Soossensz Bicker (1430–1476), married Aeltgen Eggert
 Pieter Bicker (1497–1567)
 Pieter Bicker (1522–1585), business man, politician, Diplomat, dutch delegate in Hamburg and Bremen
 Gerrit Pietersz Bicker (1554–1606), Burgemeester and councillor of Amsterdam, member and one of the founders of the Dutch East India Company (VOC)
 Andries Bicker (1586–1652), was a wealthy merchant on Russia, Amsterdam regent, burgemeester and member of the vroedschap, the leader of the Arminians, an administrator of the Dutch East India Company (VOC), representative of the States-General of the Netherlands, lord of Engelenburg etc.
 Alida Bicker, married to Jacob Jacobsz Bicker (1612-1676)
 Gerard Bicker (1622–1666), lord of Engelenburg, Baljuw of Muiden
 Cornelia Bicker (1629–1708), married Joachim Irgens av Vestervig
 Jacob Bicker (1588–1647), lord of Engelenburg and director of the Oostzeevaart
 Jan Bicker (1591–1653), Amsterdam politician, shipbuilder and merchant
 Wendela Bicker (1635–1668), wife of Johan de Witt
 Jacoba Bicker (1640–1695), married her cousin Pieter de Graeff 
 Cornelis Bicker (1592–1654), Burgemeester of Amsterdam, lord of Swieten, an administrator of the Dutch East India Company (VOC)
 Elisabeth Bicker van Swieten (1623-1656), married Andries de Graeff 
 Gerard Bicker (I) van Zwieten (1632–1716), free lord of Oud-Haarlem and Kortenbosch, lord of Swieten, Rekenmeester of Holland
 Gerard Bicker (II) van Zwieten (1687–1753), knight banneret of Baronnye and of high Lordship Kessel, Lord of Swieten, Heikoop and Boeikoop, advisor of Amsterdam
 Laurens Bicker (1563–1606), Dutch admiral, trader and merchant at Guinea
 Jacob Pietersz Bicker (1581–1626)
 Jacob Jacobsz Bicker (1612-1676), Knight of St Marcus, Captain Major of the garrison in Amsterdam and Schepen of 's Graveland; married to Alida Bicker, daughter of Andries Bicker (1586-1652)
 Hendrick Jacobsz Bicker (1615–1651), Captain of the Amsterdam Citizens Guard
 Hendrik Bicker (1649–1718), Burgemeester of Amsterdam
 Hendrik Bicker (1682–1738)
 Jan Berend Bicker (1695–1750)
 Henric Bicker (1722–1783)
 Jan Bernd Bicker (1746–1812), politician, member and president of the Batavian Republic's executive organ, the Staatsbewind
 Jan Bernd Bicker (1733-1774)

Coat of arms
 

Description:
Quartered, I and IV in gold a red crossbar Van den Anxter [maternal ancestors], II and III in silver three black tillers Helmer(s) [paternal ancestors] placed one above the other, A half-sighted helmet, wrinkled silver and red, tarpaulins red and gold, helmet sign an emerging beard man of natural color on a silver pedestal, dressed in old red clothes, gold knotted and decorated and with an old-fashioned red cap, gold decorated, holding with the right hand at the back and with the left hand at the front a golden torch.

Gallery

Notes

Literature 
 Israel, Jonathan I. (1995) The Dutch Republic – Its Rise, Greatness, and Fall – 1477–1806, Clarendon Press, Oxford, 
 Rowen, Herbert H. (1986) John de Witt – Statesman of the "True Freedom", Cambridge University Press, 
 Zandvliet, Kees De 250 rijksten van de Gouden Eeuw – Kapitaal, macht, familie en levensstijl (2006 Amsterdam; Nieuw Amsterdam Uitgevers)
 Burke, P. (1994) Venice and Amsterdam. A study of seventeenth-century élites.

External links and Commons 
 Het Archief van de familie Bicker en aanverwante families